Dr Donald Russell is a former senior Australian public servant and administrator. He is currently the Chairman of AustralianSuper, Australia's largest superannuation fund.

Education
Don Russell has a PhD from the London School of Economics, a Masters of Economics from the Australian National University and a Bachelor of Economics with first-degree honours from Flinders University.

Career
Russell joined the Australian Public Service as a Cadet in the Department of the Treasury.

Between 1985 and 1993, Russell was principal advisor to then Treasurer Paul Keating.

In 1993, Russell was named Ambassador to the United States, based in Washington. He returned to Canberra in 1995 to again work as Principal Adviser to Paul Keating, by then Prime Minister, ahead of the 1996 federal election. Shortly after the Australian Government announced that Russell would be returning to Australia, Russell made comments criticising the Opposition. This led Shadow Foreign Minister Alexander Downer to denounce his actions and call for him to step down immediately.

Between 1997 and 2000, Russell worked for the research and money management firm Sanford C. Bernstein in New York. In 2001 he returned to Sydney and took a position with WestLB Asset Management (WestAM). In January 2008, State Super (NSW) appointed Russell as Independent Chairperson. Russell worked at BNY Mellon Asset Management Australia as Global Investment Strategist until March 2010.

Russell was appointed to the role of Secretary of the Department of Innovation, Industry, Science and Research in June 2011. He managed the Department through several changes of function and Minister as it transitioned to become first the Department of Industry, Innovation, Science, Research and Tertiary Education and later the Department of Industry, Innovation, Climate Change, Science, Research and Tertiary Education.

From November 2011 to November 2012, Russell was a director on the Board of the CSIRO, an Australian Government science and research organisation.

He was one of three public servant heads to be sacked by the incoming Abbott Government in September 2013, most likely due to his time as Labor Prime Minister Paul Keating's senior adviser.

In June 2014 his appointment to head the South Australia Department of State Development was announced, and he formally commenced work on 4 August. On his appointment, South Australian Premier Jay Weatherill praised his 'strong apprehension of how Government can leverage investment and develop the skills required by industry'. In the role, Russell is tasked with leading his department to guide industry, business and communities identify and capitalise upon opportunities for job creation and economic growth.

Since 2015, Russell has been a member of the South Australia and the Northern Territory State Advisory Council for the Committee for Economic Development of Australia (CEDA).

Following the March 2018 SA General Election, the victorious Marshall government announced that Russell would be replaced in his public service role.

Resources sector advocacy 
In his first public address as Chief Executive of South Australia's Department of State Development Russell advocated for the growth of the state's resources sector. He told a mining conference in Whyalla that 'a growing number of successful mines (will) create a virtuous circle supporting an expanding array of industry-backed research initiatives along with exploration and mining service companies.' He described the new department's roles to include ensuring that universities 'turn world-class research into commercial results' and that the current regulatory framework is retained in order to facilitate new investment into the state. The South Australian government subsequently announced that 'Unlocking the full potential of South Australia’s resources, energy and renewable assets' was its top economic priority.

Awards
Russell received the 1995 Flinders University Convocation Medal. In 2005, Russell was added to the distinguished Alumni Hall of Fame of the Faculty of Economics and Commerce at the Australian National University. He has held the Chartered Financial Analyst designation (CFA) since 2007.

References

Living people
Year of birth missing (living people)
Alumni of the London School of Economics
Ambassadors of Australia to the United States
Australian National University alumni
Australian public servants
Flinders University alumni
Public servants of South Australia
CFA charterholders